Beat Studer (born 25 November 1968) is a retired Swiss football defender.

References

1968 births
Living people
Swiss men's footballers
FC Zürich players
FC Aarau players
SC Young Fellows Juventus players
Association football defenders